Tripat Rajinder Singh Bajwa is an Indian politician and a member of Indian National Congress. He is a Member of Punjab Legislative Assembly (MLA) and represents Fatehgarh Churian. He heads the Ministries of Rural Development Now Animal Husbandry Panchayats and Water Supply & Sanitation for the Government of Punjab.

Early life
Bajwa was born on 23 February 1943 to parents Gurbachan Singh Bajwa and Beant Kaur in Pakistan in Kotli Bajwa, Narowal, Sialkot.
 
Gurbachan Singh Bajwa was a cabinet minister in Gopi Chand Bhargava,  Bhim Sen Sachar and Sardar Partap Singh Kairon Cabinets and held portfolios such as PWD, Education and Chandigarh capital project.

Tripat Rajinder Singh Bajwa comes from a military family, his family has served for more than three generations in Kashmir Army and were known as family of Kumedans ( Commandants) and hails from Kotli Bajwa, Narrowal. His grandfather Lt. Col. Ishari Singh commanded 1st Kashmir Infantry and participated in capture of Jerusalem in WW1; for this action, he was awarded Order of British Indian (OBI). Lt. Col. Ishari Singh was also C.O. of Kashmir Infantry battalions Raghupartap and Rudher Shibhnabh ( refer History of J and K Rifles by Maj. Dr. Brahma Singh). Tripat Bajwa's  late cousin Capt. Baldev Singh Bajwa in 1948 Indo Pak war served in 6 Kashmir Rifles and was posted at Bunji cantonment near Gilgit and was captured fighting Gilgit scouts and Kashmir army mutineers ( Refer Memoirs of Maj. William Brown Gilgit Scouts). Capt. Baldev Singh Bajwa was held as P.O.W. at Attock fort along with Skardu hero Lt. Col. Thapa and was repatriated in 1950. Capt. Baldev Singh retired as Col. from J and K rifles and was A.D.C. to Maharaja Karan Singh of J&K. Tripat Bajwa’s younger brother also retired as Col. from Indian Army.

Political career
Tripat Rajinder Singh Bajwa started his career from grass root level, became general secretary of Youth Congress, he was elected as Qadian Municipal council member, then became president of Qadian municipality and Chairman of local Market Committee. Tripat Bajwa first fought election in 1977 from Qadian, 1980 from Sri Hargobindpur. Bajwa first successfully contested Punjab Legislative Assembly from Qadian in 1992 and won again in 2002. In March 2003, he was made Minister of Forest. However, he had to resign in August 2004 due to cabinet rejig. Tripat Rajinder Singh like his father is known to be honest upright politician and die hard Congress leader. Later, he was appointed chairman of Punjab Pollution Control Board. In 2012, he was elected from Fatehgarh Churian. He was one of the 42 INC MLAs who submitted their resignation in protest of a decision of the Supreme Court of India ruling Punjab's termination of the Sutlej-Yamuna Link (SYL) water canal unconstitutional. Tripat Rajinder Singh Bajwa was reelected from Fatehgarh Churian in 2017 and was inducted as Cabinet Minister in Capt. Amarinder Singh ministry with portfolio of  Rural development and panchayats, water supply & sanitation minister.

Bajwa won third time in a row by winning 2022 Punjab elections from Fatehgarh Churian constituency against Lakhbir Singh Lodhinangal by around 5,000 votes.  The Aam Aadmi Party gained a strong 79% majority in the sixteenth Punjab Legislative Assembly by winning 92 out of 117 seats in the 2022 Punjab Legislative Assembly election. MP Bhagwant Mann was sworn in as Chief Minister on 16 March 2022.

References 

Punjab, India MLAs 2002–2007
Punjab, India MLAs 2012–2017
Indian National Congress politicians
Year of birth missing (living people)
Place of birth missing (living people)
Living people
Punjab, India MLAs 2017–2022
Punjab, India MLAs 2022–2027